In Plurimis is a papal encyclical decreed by Pope Leo XIII on May 5, 1888 on the abolition of slavery. Using the royal we, Leo XIII addresses the bishops of Brazil on behalf of the Brazilian slaves. Leo XIII expresses his joy over the growing abolitionism in the land. He then goes on a long theological explanation, explaining how slavery is not natural but due to original sin, how Jesus came to free slaves and mankind from slavery, how the twelve Apostles taught that all men are equal before God, how the Church Fathers and the Catholic church have always been opposed to slavery, how non-Christian masters are wicked toward while Christian masters are kind toward slaves, how Christians do not enslave other Christians since they are brethren, how the Popes have always fought for slaves' rights, how Christian nations were the first to abolish slavery, and how Christian missionaries seek to introduce abolitionism to the peoples they evangelize. Leo XlII finishes the encyclical by exhorting the bishops of Brazil toward abolitionism, rejoicing over the freeing of many slaves in their land, and addressing the Brazilian slaves, offering advise on using freedom for the doing of good deeds.

See also
 The Bible and slavery
 Catholic Church and slavery
 Christian views on slavery
 Slavery and religion
 Abolitionism

External link
Vatican.Va: In Plurimis (May 5, 1888) Leo XIII

Catholic social teaching
Catholic moral theology
Catholicism-related controversies
Catholicism and slavery